Exile is a 2016 Cambodian-French documentary film edited, written, and directed by Rithy Panh which explores the effects of forced displacement. It was selected to screen in the Special Screenings section of the 2016 Cannes Film Festival.

Production
Filmmaker Rithy Panh made the film to depict his acts of defiance during the rule of the Khmer Rouge in Kampuchea (now Cambodia), reflecting on "how, when faced with acts of barbarism, one might resist."

Featuring
Randal Douc as the narrator
Sang Nan

References

2016 films
2016 documentary films
Autobiographical documentary films
Cambodian documentary films
Documentary films about refugees
Films directed by Rithy Panh
French documentary films
2010s French-language films
Khmer-language films
2010s French films
2016 multilingual films
Cambodian multilingual films
French multilingual films